Phoenix, New Jersey may refer to:

Phoenix, Edison, New Jersey
Phoenix, Sayreville, New Jersey